The 1951 municipal election was held November 7, 1951 to elect a mayor and five aldermen to sit on Edmonton City Council and four trustees to sit on the separate school board, while four trustees were acclaimed to the public board.  The electorate also decided four plebiscite questions.

There were ten aldermen on city council, but five of the positions were already filled: Edwin Clarke, Duncan Innes (SS), Richmond Francis Hanna, Frederick John Mitchell, and Athelstan Bissett (SS) were all elected to two-year terms in 1950 and were still in office.

There were seven trustees on the public school board, but three of the positions were already filled:
Harry Fowler, Robert Rae, and Charles Cummins had been acclaimed to two-year terms in 1950 and were still in office.  The same was true on the separate board, where Adrian Crowe (SS), Francis Killeen, and James O'Hara were continuing.

Voter turnout

There were 41,515 ballots cast out of 98,882 eligible voters, for a voter turnout of 41.0%.

Results

 bold or  indicates elected
 italics indicate incumbent
 "SS", where data is available, indicates representative for Edmonton's South Side, with a minimum South Side representation instituted after the city of Strathcona, south of the North Saskatchewan River, amalgamated into Edmonton on February 1, 1912.

Mayor

Aldermen

Public school trustees

Separate (Catholic) school trustees

Plebiscites

 Financial plebiscite items required a minimum two-thirds "Yes" majority to bring about action

Paving

Shall Council pass a bylaw creating a sinking fund debenture debt in the sum of $1,060,000 for the City share of paving of residential and arterial streets?
Yes - 16,027
No - 3,039

Incinerator Upgrades

Shall Council pass a bylaw creating a debenture debt in the sum of $300,000 for the purpose of modernization and enlarging the capacity of the present city incinerator?
Yes - 13,827
No - 4,217

Equipment for the City Engineers' Department

Shall Council pass a bylaw creating a debenture debt in the sum of $200,000 to purchase construction and scavenging equipment and traffic light equipment for the City Engineers’ Department?
Yes - 15,072
No - 3,248

Building Extensions

Shall Council pass a bylaw creating a debenture debt in the sum of $65,000 for extensions to Engineers’ yard and shop buildings?
Yes - 10,794
No - 6,553

References

Election History, City of Edmonton: Elections and Census Office

1951
1951 elections in Canada
1951 in Alberta